Thomas Anthony Hollowell (born April 8, 1981 in Copperas Cove, Texas) is the current coach for  
defensive ends and outside linebackers at Coastal Carolina. He was previously the linebackers coach for the Youngstown State Penguins under head coach Bo Pelini and before that a graduate assistant coach for the Nebraska Cornhuskers.

Hollowell entered the National Football League in 2004, signing as an undrafted free agent with the New York Giants. He played on special teams for four games with the Giants his rookie season. In 2005, he saw time on the active roster of the New York Jets and the practice rosters of the Giants and the Chicago Bears. He attended Denver Broncos' training camps in 2006 and 2007. He signed with the Edmonton Eskimos of the Canadian Football League on November 16, 2007.

References

External links
Edmonton Eskimos player page

1981 births
Living people
People from Copperas Cove, Texas
American football linebackers
Nebraska Cornhuskers football players
New York Giants players
New York Jets players
Chicago Bears players
American players of Canadian football
Canadian football linebackers
Edmonton Elks players
Nebraska Cornhuskers football coaches